James L. Ackerson (1881-1931) was a United States Navy officer.  He served as vice president and trustee of the United States Shipping Board Emergency Fleet Corp in 1918.  Ackerson died on September 13, 1931.

The SS James L. Ackerson was named after him.

References 

United States Navy personnel of World War I
1881 births
1931 deaths